Dingle was a constituency represented in the Irish House of Commons until its abolition on 1 January 1801.

Boundaries and Boundary Changes 
This constituency was based in the town of Dingle in County Kerry.

History 
It was incorporated by charter in 1607 with a Provost, 12 Burgesses and 150 freemen two resident. It had a corporation, and the electorate consisted of 13 burgesses and 150 freemen. In the Patriot Parliament of 1689 summoned by James II, Dingle was represented with two members. Following the Act of Union 1800 the borough was disenfranchised.

Members of Parliament, 1585–1801
1585 Thomas Trant and James Trant
1613–1615 Thomas Trant FitzRichard and Michael Hussey
1634–1635 Dominick Rice and James Rice
1639–1649 Sir George Blundell, 2nd Baronet and Christopher Roper
1661–1666 Launcelot Sandes and Samuel Bathurst (Bathurst sat for Sligo - replaced 1661 by Robert Fowkes)

1689–1801

Notes

References

Bibliography

 Johnston-Liik, E. M. (2002). History of the Irish Parliament, 1692–1800, Publisher: Ulster Historical Foundation (28 February 2002), History of the Irish Parliament Online - Ulster Historical Foundation
 T. W. Moody, F. X. Martin, F. J. Byrne, A New History of Ireland 1534–1691, Oxford University Press, 1978

Constituencies of the Parliament of Ireland (pre-1801)
Dingle
Historic constituencies in County Kerry
1607 establishments in Ireland
1800 disestablishments in Ireland
Constituencies established in 1607
Constituencies disestablished in 1800